"Break My Soul" is a single by American singer and songwriter Beyoncé. It was released on June 20, 2022, through Parkwood Entertainment and Columbia Records as the lead single from Beyoncé's seventh studio album, Renaissance (2022). The song was written by Beyoncé, Tricky Stewart, The-Dream, Jens Christian Isaken, and her husband Jay-Z, but produced by the former four. It samples Big Freedia's 2014 bounce track "Explode", written by Freedia and Adam Pigott, and Robin S.'s house song "Show Me Love", written by Allen George and Fred McFarlane.

"Break My Soul" has been described as a dance-pop and house track. The song was met with critical acclaim upon release, with praise towards its production and lyrics. "Break My Soul" topped the US Billboard Hot 100 and Hot Dance/Electronic Songs charts. Outside of the U.S., "Break My Soul" topped the charts in Croatia, Ireland, Israel and Lebanon, and peaked within the top 10 of the charts in many other countries, including Australia, Canada, and the United Kingdom.

"Break My Soul" received three nominations at the 65th Annual Grammy Awards: Record of the Year, Song of the Year and Best Dance/Electronic Recording, winning the latter. Additionally, the Terry Hunter remix was nominated for Best Remixed Recording.

Background and release
In an interview with the British Vogue in June 2022, Beyoncé announced her upcoming seventh studio album Renaissance, the first part of a trilogy series, for release on July 29, and called it "her most ambitious musical project to date". The song title and its release date were revealed through the singer's social media bios on June 20, 2022; no further announcement was made. Several streaming services, including Spotify and Apple Music, immediately confirmed the news.

"Break My Soul" was revealed to be the title of the album's first single. Originally intended to be released at midnight Eastern Time on June 21 to coincide with the 2022 June solstice, the song was released to music streaming service Tidal and YouTube two hours prior, on June 20. "Break My Soul" marks Beyoncé's first single release from a solo studio album in six years.

Robin S. told British TV morning show Good Morning Britain that she only found out that "Show Me Love" had been sampled when her son called her to tell her that she was trending on Twitter. She told the hosts that she was grateful and open to collaborating with Beyoncé in the future. The sampling also led to the singer being inundated with requests from record labels, corporations and other artists to license the song's master recordings for various purposes. Robin S. further praised Beyoncé for acknowledging and appreciating her music, calling it "one of the highest compliments ever". American singer Crystal Waters, who helped make house music mainstream in the 1990s, stated she was "ecstatic" when she heard "Break My Soul", and expressed gratitude for Beyoncé for helping shine a light on underappreciated house singers.

Composition
Pitchfork writer Matthew Strauss described the song as "a dance song that is intended to mark the start of a new era with new anthems". Mikael Wood of the Los Angeles Times called the track a "thumping 1990s-style house jam" with lyrics that connect the song "explicitly to its roots in Black and queer communities". Others wrote that the record is a "boisterous and euphoric slice of '90s diva house" (Tara Joshi of The Guardian), a "confidence-oozing comeback that embraces nu-disco" (Kyann-Sian Williams of NME), and "the mother of all dance-pop tunes" (Jack King of GQ).

Lyrically, the track sees Beyoncé "using her growliest voice to describe a search for liberation from a crushing job... and a nerve-jangling pandemic" and is "filled with dancefloor-friendly lines... and a repeated exhortation of 'Everybody'." In the chorus, "[t]he title is flipped" as Beyoncé sings "You won't break my soul".  Fans and media outlets drew connections between lyrics like "Now I just fell in love / And I just quit my job" and the Great Resignation, a surge in Americans leaving their jobs due to wage stagnation and dissatisfaction with labor conditions. Glamour reported that some listeners had already quit their jobs due to these lyrics and expected others to follow suit.

"Break My Soul" prominently samples Big Freedia's 2014 bounce song "Explode" and Robin S.'s 1993 house-pop single "Show Me Love". According to Musicnotes.com, the song is performed in the key of G minor with a tempo of 115 beats per minute in common time.  Beyoncé's vocals span from F3 to D5 in the song.

Critical reception

"Break My Soul" was lauded by critics upon release. In a five-star review for i, Lauren O'Neill described "Break My Soul" as a "floorfilling home run of a comeback" that makes you "give in to the impulses of your body and lose yourself in it". O'Neill praised Beyoncé for exploring new sounds on the track, while employing her impressive vocals and rapping skills "to offer something that feels completely new and still entirely her own". British music critic Kitty Empire described the song as an "instant classic" and an "ecstatic house music anthem of our times".

Varietys Jem Aswad described the song as highly anticipated by fans of Beyoncé, calling it "a driving dance track", before acknowledging the song's "plinking" and "insistent" hook. Julianne Escobedo Shepherd of Pitchfork called the track "dancefloor liberation" that features "Beyoncé as an SSRI, her attempt to assuage widespread depression and crushing stress." She goes on to highlight the song's position in a lineage of vocal house music and "Black queer tradition", calling it a "palimpsest [with] evocations and sounds layered deep in the sense memories of club heads." Writing for NME, Kyann-Sian Williams reported that "It's amazing to see a rise in black visibility in dance music" referring to Drake's Honestly, Nevermind alongside "Break My Soul". Williams finds some problems in the track, but nevertheless affirms that "singing over dance tracks is not easy, and only the best R&B stars can do so" in a song "sassy, full of pride; [...] It's more than a few tempo and melody issues, thanks to its beautiful message of confidence".

Writing for Billboard, Larisha Paul highlighted the song's "nearly five-minute run time in an algorithmic streaming age where even venturing beyond three minutes feels like a risk." Further, she praised the production for "allow[ing] the record to breathe, trading in rushed, overcrowded urgency for high energy, four-to-the-floor beats." Kyle Denis of the same publication praised Beyoncé for overcoming ageism in the music industry, writing that the elements of bounce and rap help the house track feel "fresh and uniquely Beyoncé." He further praised her for honoring dance music's Black and queer origins, building on her transformation into "one of the key sociopolitical artists of the past decade" that began with Lemonade (2016).

Rolling Stone placed the song at number 108 on its list of the 200 Greatest Dance Songs of All Time. Billboard listed the song on its list of 50 Best Dance Song of 2022.

Awards and nominations

Commercial performance

North America
In the United States, "Break My Soul" debuted at number 15 on the Billboard Hot 100 with only three days of sales, becoming Beyoncé's 41st top 40 single as a solo artist and her highest debut since "Walk on Water" in 2017. The song also debuted atop the Digital Songs chart, becoming Beyoncé's tenth number-one. The following week, the song reached a new peak of number seven after a full tracking week, becoming Beyoncé's 20th top 10 single as a solo act and her 30th career top 10 single, which includes her group Destiny's Child. The song also became Beyoncé's first top 10 single in the United States since 2020's remix of "Savage" with Megan Thee Stallion and her first solo top 10 since 2016's "Formation". She joined Paul McCartney and Michael Jackson as the only artists in Hot 100 history to achieve at least 20 top-10s as a solo artist and 10 as a member of a group. "Break My Soul" also topped the Hot Dance/Electronic Songs chart, becoming Beyoncé's first number-one on this chart. For the week of July 31, the song reached a new peak of number six on the Hot 100 and spent its fifth week atop the Hot Dance/Electronic Songs chart. Following the release of Renaissance, "Break My Soul" ascended to the top of the Hot 100, becoming Beyoncé's eighth number-one single as a solo artist and her twelfth including Destiny's Child. The song was driven by 18.9 million streams, 13,000 downloads, and 61.7 million audience impressions for the week ending August 4, 2022. In doing so, Beyoncé holds the eighth-longest span between first and most recent number-one songs on the chart as a solo artist, with 19 years and one month since "Crazy in Love" featuring Jay-Z began its eight weeks at the summit on July 12, 2003. Additionally, it marked her first Hot 100 number-one as a solo artist since "Single Ladies (Put a Ring on It)" in 2008, nearly 14 years prior. This marked the charts' longest gap between solo number-one singles since Cher's "Believe" ascended to the top of the chart in March 1999, 24 years and 12 months since "Dark Lady" in March 1974. The song topped the chart for two consecutive weeks. The song also topped the Hot R&B/Hip-Hop Songs, Hot R&B Songs, and logged a sixth week atop the Hot Dance/Electronic Songs chart, becoming the first song ever to top all four charts simultaneously.

The song debuted at number 10 on the R&B/Hip-Hop Airplay chart with 10.1 million audience impressions from six days of radio airplay. Upon doing so, "Break My Soul" became Beyoncé's 32nd top 10 hit on the R&B/Hip-Hop Airplay chart, tying R. Kelly and Usher for the sixth-most among all acts. Further, the song became only the ninth song ever and the first since Toni Braxton's "You're Makin' Me High" debuted at number nine in May 1996 to debut within the top 10 since the chart began in 1992. The song topped the chart for the week ending July 31, becoming Beyoncé's 9th number-one on the chart, tying her with Chris Brown for the third most number-one songs on the chart. 
	
In Canada, "Break My Soul" debuted at number 29 for the week of July 2, 2022. The next week, it rose 21 positions to reach a new peak of number eight, becoming Beyoncé's ninth top 10 single in the country as a solo act. Following the release of Renaissance, the song reached a new peak of number four.

International
In the United Kingdom, the song debuted at number 21 on the UK Singles Chart on June 24, 2022, becoming Beyoncé's 36th top 40 song in Britain as a solo artist. The following week, the song climbed 17 positions to reach a new peak of number four, becoming Beyoncé's 20th top 10 single in the country as a solo act and her 33rd including those with Destiny's Child. Upon the release of Renaissance, "Break My Soul" rose four positions to reach a new peak of number two, held off the summit by LF System's "Afraid to Feel", and became Beyoncé's highest-peaking single in Britain as a solo artist since "If I Were a Boy" peaked at the top of the UK Singles Chart in November 2008.

In the Ireland, the song debuted at number 18 on the Irish Singles Chart, becoming her 24th top 20 single in the country. The following week, the song reached a new peak of number two, becoming Beyoncé's first top 10 single in the country since 2017's "Walk on Water" with Eminem. Upon the release of Renaissance, "Break My Soul" rose two positions to number one, overtaking Kate Bush's "Running Up That Hill". The song became Beyoncé's fifth number-one single in the country as a solo act, and her first since 2010's "Telephone" with Lady Gaga.

In Australia, "Break My Soul" debuted at number 32 on the ARIA Singles Chart based on a partial week of sales for the week of June 24, 2022. Following the album's release, the song reached a new peak of number six, becoming Beyoncé's 23rd top 10 single in the country and the first since 2017.

Remixes
On August 3, Beyoncé released an EP of four remixed versions of the track, produced by will.i.am, Terry Hunter, Honey Dijon, and Nita Aviance. Terry Hunter was nominated for Best Remixed Recording at the 65th Grammy Awards for his remix.

On August 5, Beyoncé released a remix exclusively through her online store, before releasing it to streaming services; "The Queens Remix" is a collaboration with Madonna, sampling and interpolating her 1990 song "Vogue". It features Beyoncé name-dropping her sister Solange Knowles, her former Destiny's Child bandmates Kelly Rowland and Michelle Williams, and her musical protégés Chlöe and Halle Bailey, along with Madonna, Rosetta Tharpe, Santigold, Bessie Smith, Nina Simone, Betty Davis, Erykah Badu, Lauryn Hill, Lizzo, Roberta Flack, Toni Braxton, Janet Jackson, Tierra Whack, Missy Elliott, Diana Ross, Grace Jones, Aretha Franklin, Anita Baker, Sade, Jill Scott, Aaliyah, Alicia Keys, Whitney Houston, Rihanna and Nicki Minaj, before naming ballroom houses such as House of Xtravaganza, House of Aviance and House of LaBeija. Jon Caramanica from The New York Times called this remix, "electric, both philosophically and musically".

Track listing and formats
1-track digital single
"Break My Soul" – 4:38

3-track digital single
"Break My Soul" – 4:38
"Break My Soul" (a cappella version) – 4:04
"Break My Soul" (instrumental version) – 4:35

Remixes EP
"Break My Soul" (will.i.am remix) – 3:58
"Break My Soul" (Terry Hunter remix) – 5:30
"Break My Soul" (Honey Dijon remix) – 6:27
"Break My Soul" (Nita Aviance club mix) – 9:54

The Queens Remix
"Break My Soul" (The Queens Remix; with Madonna) – 5:56

Personnel and credits

Samples
Contains elements of "Show Me Love", written by Allen George and Fred Craig McFarlane and performed by Robin S.
Contains a sample of "Explode", written by Adam James Piggott and Freddie Ross, performed by Big Freedia.
"The Queens Remix" contains an interpolation of "Vogue", written by Madonna and Shep Pettibone, performed by Madonna.

Recording locations
Avenue A Studio West (Los Angeles, California)
Henson Recording Studios (Los Angeles, California)
The Juicy Juicy (Los Angeles, California)
Parkwood West (Los Angeles, California)
SING Mastering (Atlanta, Georgia)
The Trailer East Hampton (New York)

Personnel
Performers
 Vocals by Beyoncé
Additional vocals by Big Freedia
Background vocals by The Samples Choir:

Erik Brooks
Herman Bryant
Porcha Clay
Jonathan Coleman
Caleb Curry
Deanna Dixon
Alexandria Griffin

Naarai Jacobs
Kim Johnson
Kristen Lowe
Jorel Quinn
Chris McLaughlin
Anthony McEastland
Chelsea Miller

Jamal Moore
Jasmine Patton
Javonte Pollard
Fallynn Rian
Ashley Washington
Danie Withers
Ashly Williams 

Technical credits
 Beyoncé – production, vocal production
 Matheus Braz – assistant engineering
 John Cranfield – engineering
 Brandon Harding – recording
 Christian Isaken – co-production
 Colin Leonard – mastering
 Chris McLaughlin – recording, backing vocals
 Andrea Roberts – engineering
 Tricky Stewart – production
 The-Dream – production
 Jason White – conductor
 Stuart White – mixing, recording

Charts

Weekly charts

Year-end charts

Certifications

Release history

Notes

References

External links
 

2022 singles
2022 songs
American dance-pop songs
American house music songs
Beyoncé songs
Billboard Hot 100 number-one singles
Irish Singles Chart number-one singles
Madonna songs
Song recordings produced by Beyoncé
Song recordings produced by The-Dream
Song recordings produced by Tricky Stewart
Songs written by Beyoncé
Songs written by Fred McFarlane
Songs written by Jay-Z
Songs written by The-Dream
Songs written by Tricky Stewart
Cultural depictions of Bessie Smith
Columbia Records singles